The 1982 Baltimore Colts season was the 30th season for the team in the National Football League (NFL), and the Colts’ penultimate season in Baltimore. It was their first under former Arizona State coach Frank Kush, who was hired to replace Mike McCormack after he recorded a 2-14 record in 1981. 

The Colts finished the NFL's strike-shortened 1982 season without a victory, finishing with eight losses and one tie in their nine games. The Colts became the third team since the league’s expansion era began in 1960, after the 1960 Dallas Cowboys and the 1976 Tampa Bay Buccaneers, and the second team since the AFL-NFL merger to finish a regular season winless Since then, the 2008 Detroit Lions and the 2017 Cleveland Browns have posted winless seasons; the Colts are the only one of these five teams that did not do so in a full, uninterrupted season (the Cowboys played twelve games, the Buccaneers fourteen, and the Lions and Browns sixteen, as per the league standards of the time). The Colts are also the only winless team to not have a winning percentage of .000 due to the tie giving them a percentage of .056 which is the worst non-zero win percentage for a team in post-1900s North American sports history. This record is only breakable by an NFL team going 0–16–1 (.029) in a season, an MLB team going 8–154 or worse, an NBA team going 4–78 or worse, or by an NHL team finishing with 9 points or fewer.

As mentioned above, the NFL's 1982 season was disrupted by a strike by the league's players. In the Colts’ first game after the end of the strike on November 21, they were shut out by the New York Jets 37–0. The following week, they were shut out by the Buffalo Bills 20–0, in a game in which the Colts offense never crossed the 50 yard line. But the week after that, they lost by only three points to the playoff-bound and defending AFC champion Cincinnati Bengals. It would be the final season the Colts tied a game for 40 years.

Offseason

NFL draft

Undrafted free agents

Personnel

Staff

Roster

Regular season

Schedule

Standings

See also 
 History of the Indianapolis Colts
 List of Indianapolis Colts seasons
 Colts–Patriots rivalry

References 

Baltimore Colts
1982
Baltimore
National Football League winless seasons